My Guitar Princess is a 2018 Philippine television drama series starring Julie Anne San Jose, Gil Cuerva and Kiko Estrada. The series premiered on GMA Network's noontime block and worldwide on GMA Pinoy TV from May 7 to July 13, 2018, replacing Ang Forever Ko'y Ikaw.

NUTAM (Nationwide Urban Television Audience Measurement) People in Television Homes ratings are provided by AGB Nielsen Philippines.

Series overview

Episodes

May 2018

June 2018

July 2018

References

Lists of Philippine drama television series episodes